Mian Nasir Muhammad Kalhoro  was a famous pioneer and main ruler of Kalhora Dynasty who ruled over Sindh from 1657 AD to 1692 AD) and died in 1692 AD. His tomb and graveyard is sited in Dadu District, taluka Khairpur Nathan Shah at distance of 12 kilometres towards west near village Garhi in Sindh Pakistan. 

Kalhoro is pure Sindhi clan but Shah was their title given by their disciples.
Mian Nasir Muhammad Kalhoro belonged to Noble Kalhora Family whose first historical personality was Mian Adam Shah Kalhoro whose shrine is at heart of the city Sukkur. Mian Nasir Muhammad succeeded legacy of forefathers and their Mianwal Movement which struggled against Mughal Empire He was not only ruler but also a spiritual leader of Mianwal Movement. During movement against Mughals Mian Nasir Muhammad Kalhoro was imprisoned by Mughals in Gwalior jail and was conditionally released from jail. The cemetery where he is buried is famous after his name as graveyard of Mian Nasir Muhammad Kalhoro.

References

Sindhi people
History of Sindh
17th-century monarchs in Asia